The Transylvanian Saxon University was an official governing body of the Transylvanian Saxon community in Transylvania during the Late Middle Ages up until the late Modern Age. The Saxon University was led by the Saxon Count.

The Saxon University was constituted at the royal order of Hungarian King Matthias Corvinus in 1486. From 1486 up until 1876, the Saxon University worked as a self-governing (or autonomous) administrative body of the Saxon ethnicity in the Principality of Transylvania and then in the Grand Principality of Transylvania (from 1765 onwards). From 1876 up until the year of its dissolution in 1937, the Saxon University became and functioned as a foundation of the Transylvanian Saxons, thereby coordinating the activity of their schools and Evangelical Lutheran churches in the process.

Name 

The name can be quite problematic at first glance given the fact that it does not refer to a university per se but it rather signifies a medieval estate of the realm based on ethnic criterion, ascribing the entire ethnicity of Transylvanian Saxons who lived in Transylvania starting with the Middle Ages, then part of the Kingdom of Hungary.

Historical background 

The Transylvanian Saxon University encompassed the seven seats of the Saxons (i.e. Sieben Stühle) in Transylvania (all under the high seat of Sibiu/Hermannstadt known as Hermannstädter Hauptstuhl), the later two seats of Șeica and Mediaș as well as the two districts of Brașov and Bistrița, all of them previously inhabited by a significant Transylvanian Saxon population since the High Middle Ages up until the 20th century.

Following its creation during medieval times, the Saxons in Transylvania became a 'political nation' alongside the Hungarians and Szeklers in Transylvania, obtaining thus the right to be politically represented within the Diet of Transylvania.

Former Sibiu/Hermannstadt mayor Thomas Altemberger received the rights of the Transylvanian Saxon University from King Matthias Corvinus (reinforcing what was previously stipulated within the Diploma Andreanum) for all Saxons living in Transylvania (i.e. universorum Saxonum nostrorum partium regni nostri Transsilvanorum). During the early part of the 19th century, more specifically in 1821, the seat of the Transylvanian Saxon University was moved to the Hecht house in Sibiu/Hermannstadt (which previously served as the town's mint house in the 15th century).

During the mid-19th century, the Transylvanian Saxon University conferred more rights to the Romanian ethnic majority in Transylvania, managing to offer Romanians equal rights and status as those of the Saxons in the Saxon-administered lands across Transylvania.

Gallery

See also 

 Universitas Valachorum
 Eyes of Sibiu, in connection to the architecture of the Hecht house
 Transylvanian Saxon culture

Notes

References 

German diaspora in Europe
Transylvania
Transylvanian Saxon people
History of Transylvania